Bill Kohlhaase is an American music critic. He is best known for his work over decades for the Los Angeles Times and acquired a good reputation as a jazz journalist, interviewing and reviewing a number of top jazz musicians such as Miles Davis's band. Kohlhaase has regularly written the programs for the Playboy Jazz Festival and liner notes for jazz musicians. He maintains a blog, Cabbage Rabbit Review, that covers his range of interests: jazz and writing on jazz, modern fiction, graphic novels, organic gardening, and the culinary arts.

References

American music critics
American music journalists
Jazz writers
Los Angeles Times people
Living people
Year of birth missing (living people)